Mykhaylo Serhiyovych Shestakov (born 12 April 1990) is a Ukrainian professional footballer who plays as a striker for Veres Rivne.

Career
He played for several Ukrainian amateur football clubs and then spent time with some Ukrainian clubs that played in the Ukrainian Second League and Ukrainian First League. In the summer of 2021 he prolonged his contract for one year with Veres Rivne that was promoted to the Ukrainian Premier League. On 23 December 2022 he extemded his contract with the club until July 2024.

Personal life
He is the twin brother of Ukrainian football player Serhiy Shestakov.

References

External links
 
 
 

1990 births
Living people
Ukrainian footballers
People from Ladyzhyn
Association football forwards
FC Bastion Illichivsk players
FC Real Pharma Odesa players
FC Balkany Zorya players
FC SKAD-Yalpuh Bolhrad players
FC Zhemchuzhyna Odesa players
FC Sovinyon Tayirove players
FC Nyva Vinnytsia players
NK Veres Rivne players
Ukrainian Premier League players
Ukrainian First League players
Ukrainian Second League players
Ukrainian Amateur Football Championship players
Twin sportspeople
Ukrainian twins
Sportspeople from Vinnytsia Oblast